The Eastern Harbour Crossing, abbreviated as "EHC", is a combined road-rail tunnel that crosses beneath Victoria Harbour in Hong Kong. Opened on 21 September 1989, it connects Quarry Bay, Hong Kong Island and Cha Kwo Ling, Kowloon East.

History
The Hong Kong Government negotiated with several consortia to adopt the Build-Operate-Transfer (BOT) model in planning new tunnels in different parts of the territory.

In 1986, the government gave New Hong Kong Tunnel the right to run the Tunnel on a 30-year franchisee with lease expiring in August 2016. The tunnel features two components, a road part and a rail part:
 The road part of the tunnel is branded by the operator as Eastern Harbour Tunnel, although the government refers to the tunnel itself as Eastern Harbour Crossing. The tunnel is governed by the Eastern Harbour Crossing Ordinance. The road part links the Island Eastern Corridor in Hong Kong Island, Lei Yue Mun Road, Tseung Kwan O Tunnel, Tseung Kwan O——Lam Tin Tunnel and the Kwun Tong Bypass in Kowloon East.
 The rail part, lying to the southeast of the road part, runs between Quarry Bay and Yau Tong stations of the MTR Tseung Kwan O line.
The Chinese investment group CITIC Pacific is interested in both parts, controlling the road part (71% stake) and has a 50% stake in the rail part. CITIC also controls 50% of the Western Harbour Tunnel Company.

The Kowloon tunnel portal is located next to a public housing estate, Yau Lai Estate.

Tunnel tolls
Tolls are collected manually or electronically in both directions at the toll plaza on the Cha Kwo Ling side.

Notes

Interchanges

Traffic

, there are 46 bus routes passing through the tunnel.

Controversies
In June 2005, CITIC decided to raise the toll for using Eastern Harbour Crossing from HK$15 to HK$25 for private vehicles and up to 67% for other classes of vehicles, under the fare adjustment mechanism derived from the build-operate-transfer (BOT) model. This increase aroused criticisms that the model was detrimental to the public interest, with the increase shifting more traffic to the already congested Cross-Harbour Tunnel.

See also 

 Vehicular harbour crossings in Hong Kong
 List of tunnels and bridges in Hong Kong
 Megaproject

References

External links 
 Official site

Toll tunnels in Hong Kong
Railway tunnels in Hong Kong
Quarry Bay
Cha Kwo Ling
Yau Tong
Victoria Harbour
CITIC Group
1989 establishments in Hong Kong
Route 2 (Hong Kong)
Road tunnels in Hong Kong
Undersea tunnels in Asia
Immersed tube tunnels in Hong Kong
Tunnels completed in 1989